Wilkesia is a genus of Hawaiian plants in the tribe Madieae within the family Asteraceae.  It contains two perennials, both of which are endemic to the island of Kauai in Hawaii. Wilkesia is a component of the silversword alliance and is named after Captain Charles Wilkes.

Species
 Wilkesia gymnoxiphium A.Gray, 1852
 Wilkesia hobdyi H.St.John, 1971

formerly included
Wilkesia grayana - Argyroxiphium grayanum

References

External links

Madieae
Endemic flora of Hawaii
Biota of Kauai
Asteraceae genera
Taxa named by Asa Gray